Costa Panayi is a former computer game programmer active during the 1980s. He founded Vortex Software with Paul Canter, publishing games for the ZX Spectrum, Commodore 64 and Amstrad CPC.

He is of Greek Cypriot descent, and studied engineering at the University of Salford. After graduation, he started to work as a mechanical engineer for British Aerospace, when he got into programming games business from his hobby interests.

In 1982, he studied Sinclair BASIC and subsequently formed his company Vortex Software along with Luke Andrews and Mark Haigh-Hutchinson. They wrote a variety of games, including Gunlaw, the Android series, and Tornado Low Level for the ZX Spectrum.

His games achieved critical success; Tornado Low Level and Highway Encounter appeared in the "Your Sinclair official top 100", for example, and in them he developed original 3D interfaces.

In 1995, he was working as a design consultant for Fisher Price.

List of games
ZX81 Othello (1981)
Word Mastermind (1981)
Pontoon (1981)
Crash (1981)
Cosmos (1982), Abbex Electronics
Astral Convoy (1982), Vortex Software
Gunlaw (1983), Vortex Software
Android One: The Reactor Run (1983), Vortex Software
Android Two (1983), Vortex Software
Tornado Low Level (1984), Vortex Software
Cyclone (1985), Vortex Software
Highway Encounter (1985), Vortex Software
Revolution (1986), U.S. Gold
Deflektor (1987), Gremlin Graphics
Hostile All Terrain Encounter (1989), Gremlin Graphics

References
World of Spectrum entry.
Interview from Sinclair User issue 32.

External links
History of Vortex Software by Mark Haigh-Hutchinson

1957 births
Living people
People from Stretford
Video game programmers
British people of Greek Cypriot descent
Alumni of the University of Salford
British mechanical engineers